Guangxi China Resources Tower or China Resources Centre Block A is a supertall skyscraper in Nanning, Guangxi, China. Construction started in 2014 and opened on November 2, 2020. It was originally planned to be  but was cancelled mid construction due to airspace restrictions.

See also
List of tallest buildings in China

References

Buildings and structures under construction in China
Skyscrapers in Nanning
Skyscraper office buildings in China
Skyscraper hotels in China